Igbobi College is a college established by the Methodist and Anglican Churches in 1932, in the Yaba suburb of Lagos, Lagos State, South-western Nigeria. It is still on its original site and most of the original buildings are intact. It is one of the oldest colleges in Nigeria, and has been the alma mater of a number of well-known Nigerians. In 2001 the school was returned to its original owners by the Bola Tinubu led Lagos state government.

Notable alumni

Taslim Olawale Elias
J. F. Ade Ajayi
Olu Falae
Michael Ibru
K. O. Mbadiwe
Dosu Joseph
Abiodun Baruwa
Joseph Adefarasin
Yemi Osinbajo
Babatunde Fashola
Bolaji Akinyemi
Segun Awolowo
Femi Kuti
Gbolahan Mudasiru
Ernest Shonekan
Lanre Tejuosho
Babatunde Fowler
Subomi Balogun
Femi Gbajabiamila
Felix Ibru
Olufemi Elias
Dele Sosimi
Paul Adefarasin
Vice Admiral Akintunde Aduwo

Mini gallery

References

External links
Igbobi College Old Boys Association(UK)
Igbobi College Old Boys Association(North America)
Igbobi College 1932-2006, ICOBA, by J. F. Ade. Ajayi, NNMA, Emeritus Professor, University of Ibadan
https://www.today.ng/news/nigeria/asiwaju-tinubu-returned-mission-schools-governor-268179

Secondary schools in Lagos State
Educational institutions established in 1932
Schools in Lagos
1932 establishments in Nigeria
Yaba, Lagos